Garret Neal Graves (born January 31, 1972) is an American politician serving as the United States representative from Louisiana's 6th congressional district since 2015.

Early life
Garret Graves was born on January 31, 1972, to John and Cynthia (née Sliman) Graves, who was of Lebanese descent; his father owns an engineering firm. He is a Roman Catholic. Graves attended the University of Alabama, Louisiana Tech, and American University, but did not earn a degree.

Career
Graves served as an aide for nine years to former U.S. Representative Billy Tauzin of Louisiana's 3rd congressional district. He was also a legislative aide to the U.S. House Committee on Energy and Commerce, which Tauzin chaired. In 2005, he became an aide for the United States Senate Committee on Commerce, Science and Transportation, serving Republican U.S. Senator David Vitter. He was the staff director for the United States Senate's Subcommittee on Climate Change and Impacts. He also worked for Democratic former U.S. Senator John Breaux, a protege of Edwin Edwards and Vitter's predecessor in the Senate. He served as a chief legislative aide to the U.S. Senate Committee on Environment and Public Works.

In 2008, Governor Bobby Jindal appointed Graves to manage the Louisiana Coastal Protection and Restoration Authority. In the position, he negotiated on behalf of the state with British Petroleum over the Deepwater Horizon oil spill. He resigned the position, effective February 17, 2014.

U.S. House of Representatives

Elections

In the 2014 nonpartisan blanket primary, Edwin Edwards finished in first place with 30% of the vote; Graves was the runner-up with 27%. Graves and Edwards advanced to the December 6 runoff election. In the runoff, Graves received 139,209 votes (62.4%) to Edwards's 83,781 (37.6%).

In the nonpartisan blanket primary held in conjunction with the national elections on November 6, 2018, Graves handily won his third term in the U.S. House, having led a four-candidate field with 186,524 votes (69%). Democrat Justin Dewitt trailed with 55,078 votes (21%). Two other candidates, Democrat "Andie" Saizan and Independent David Lance Graham, received the remaining 3%.

Tenure
In April 2017, Graves became engaged in a public dispute with Louisiana Governor John Bel Edwards about the disbursement of federal assistance for Louisiana's 2016 flooding victims. Graves, who had been mentioned as a potential challenger to Edwards in the 2019 gubernatorial election, claimed that he was "focused on flood recovery ... none of the governor's talk is helping flood victims."

Edwards attributed the delay in disbursement of the funds, which began on April 10, to the state's financial shortfall, which prevented the quick retaining of a disaster management firm. Edwards's executive counsel, Matthew Block, explained that the state had no money in 2016 to pay the contractor. Edwards projected a $440 million budget deficit for the fiscal year that began on July 1, 2017.

Committee assignments
Committee on Natural Resources
Subcommittee on Energy and Mineral Resources
Subcommittee on Water, Oceans and Wildlife
Committee on Transportation and Infrastructure
Subcommittee on Aviation (Ranking Member)
Subcommittee on Water Resources and Environment

Caucus memberships
 Republican Study Committee
 Congressional Western Caucus
 United States Congressional International Conservation Caucus

Personal life
Graves resides in his native Baton Rouge. His wife is Carissa Vanderleest.

See also
 List of Arab and Middle-Eastern Americans in the United States Congress

References

External links

 Congressman Garret Graves official U.S. House website
 Campaign website
 
 

|-

|-

1972 births
21st-century American politicians
American politicians of Lebanese descent
American Roman Catholics
Catholics from Louisiana
Living people
People from Houma, Louisiana
Politicians from Baton Rouge, Louisiana
Republican Party members of the United States House of Representatives from Louisiana
United States congressional aides